Santo contra los Zombies (also known as Santo vs. the Zombies) is a 1961 Mexican film directed by Benito Alazraki. It depicts the popular character El Santo in a pulp-style film.

Plot 
After the police are unable to stop a crime wave by zombies, they turn to Santo for help.

Cast 

 Santo as  Santo / the Saint
 Armando Silvestre as  Lt. Sanmartin / Lt. Savage
 Jaime Fernández as  Det. Rodriguez
 Dagoberto Rodríguez as  Det. Chief Almada
 Irma Serrano as  Det. Isabel
 Carlos Agostí as  Genaro / Uncle Herbert
 Ramón Bugarini as  Rogelio / Roger, the male nurse
 Fernando Osés as  Dorrell, zombified wrestler
 Eduardo Bonada
 Eduardo Silvestre
 Julián de Meriche
 Alejandro Cruz as  Black Shadow, a wrestler (as Black Shadow)
 Gory Guerrero as  Wrestler (as Gori Guerrero)
 Sugi Sito as  Wrestler
 El Gladiador as  Wrestler

Release 
This was one of the earliest Santo films and the first to be distributed in the US.

Reception 
Writing in The Zombie Movie Encyclopedia, academic Peter Dendle said, "The adventure movie with its comic-book plot, hero, and villain is fun to watch in an MST-3K spirit".

References

External links 
 

1961 films
1960s science fiction horror films
1961 horror films
Mexican science fiction horror films
1960s Spanish-language films
Mexican black-and-white films
Lucha libre films
Mexican zombie films
Films directed by Benito Alazraki
Cultural depictions of El Santo
1960s Mexican films